Staničenje is a village in the municipality of Pirot, Serbia. At the 2002 census, the village had a population of 609 people. Two notable features in the village are St Petka's Church and the Bey's Bridge.

References

External links

Populated places in Pirot District